Allison Randall (born 25 February 1988) is an American-born
Jamaican athlete. She competed for Jamaica in the discus throw at the 2012 Summer Olympics the year after winning a bronze medal at the Central American and Caribbean (CAC) games.

In 2012, Randall held the Jamaican discus record for a throw of 61.21 meters.

Dr. Allison Randall is in her third season in 2021-22 as Vanderbilt women’s basketball’s head strength and conditioning coach.

Prior to coming to West End, Randall was the associate director of strength and conditioning for Olympic sports at Virginia Tech. Randall served at Virginia Tech as an intern, graduate assistant and full-time employee from 2012-19.

In 2018, Randall earned her Ph.D. in instruction design and technology with an emphasis on psychomotor skill instruction for athletic performance in novice learners. She also earned her master’s from Pittsburgh State in 2013 in health, human performance and recreation, and an undergraduate degree in physical education from Morgan State in 2011.

Randall has been certified in several areas of strength and conditioning, including SCCC (Strength and Conditioning Certified) through the CSCCA (Collegiate Strength and Conditioning Association); CSCS (Certified Strength and Conditioning Specialist) through the NSCA (National Strength and Conditioning Association); USAW Level-1 Sports Performance (United States of America Weightlifting); FMS-1 (Functional Movement Screen) and First Aid/CPR/AED (American Red Cross Association); and is a certified nutrition coach through the National Academy of Sports Medicine.

Randall competed multiple times in the discus throw for Jamaica on the international stage, including the 2013 Central American and Caribbean Games (gold medalist), 2012 London Olympics, 2011 Pan American Games and the 2011 Central American and Caribbean Games (bronze medalist). She also represented Morgan State at the 2010 NCAA Outdoor Track and Field Championships.

She is also the owner of Max Sports Performance, LLC, with is an online company providing products and services for sport performance and personal training clients.

References

Jamaican female discus throwers
Athletes (track and field) at the 2012 Summer Olympics
Olympic athletes of Jamaica
1988 births
Living people
Jamaican sportspeople in doping cases
Doping cases in athletics